Genocide justification is the claim that a genocide is morally excusable or necessary, in contrast to genocide denial, which rejects that genocide occurred. Perpetrators often claim that the genocide victims presented a serious threat, meaning that their killing was legitimate self-defense of a nation or state. According to modern international criminal law, there can be no excuse for genocide. 

Genocide is often camouflaged as military activity against combatants, and the distinction between denial and justification is often blurred.

Examples of genocide justification include Turkish nationalists' claims in regard to the Armenian genocide, the Nazis' justifications behind the Holocaust, anti-Tutsi propaganda during the Rwandan genocide, Serbian nationalists' justifications for the Srebrenica massacre, and the Myanmar government's claims about the Rohingya genocide.

Legality
Several laws against genocide denial also forbid the justification of genocide. In addition, some countries have laws against genocide justification but not genocide denial. For example, in Spain, a law criminalizing genocide denial was struck down as unconstitutional by the Spanish Supreme Court.

Justification of genocide during ongoing killings may constitute incitement to genocide, which is criminalized under international criminal law.

In general
According to W. Michael Reisman, "in many of the most hideous international crimes, many of the individuals who are directly responsible operate within a cultural universe that inverts our morality and elevates their actions to the highest form of group, tribe, or national defense". Bettina Arnold observed, "It is one of the terrible ironies of the systematic extermination of one people by another that its justification is considered necessary." She also argued that archaeology and ancient history was sometimes used to justify genocide. Robert Zajonc wrote, "I was not able to find any accounts of massacres not viewed by their perpetrators as right and necessary." Rationalizing genocide helps perpetrators accept their actions and role in the genocide, preserving their self-image.

According to the Encyclopedia of Genocide, eugenics advocate Francis Galton bordered on the justification of genocide when he stated, "There exists a sentiment, for the most part quite unreasonable, against the gradual extinction of an inferior race."

Examples

1804 Haiti massacre 
According to the historian Philippe R. Girard, the genocide of French Creoles after the Haitian Revolution was justified by its perpetrators based on the following rationales: 
 The ideals of the French Revolution justified the massacre.
 Atrocities committed by French troops in Haiti permitted revenge. 
 Radical measures were necessary to secure victory in the war and emancipate the slaves.
 Whites were not human.
 Black leaders hoped to take over plantations previously owned by whites.

Girard notes that after the massacre, the man who ordered it, Jean-Jacques Dessalines, stated, "We answered these cannibals’ war with war, crime with crime, outrage with outrage." For Dessalines, Girard writes, "genocide merely amounted to vengeance, even justice". Historian C. L. R. James wrote that massacre was only a tragedy for its perpetrators because of the brutal practices of slaveholding.

Adam Jones and Nicholas Robinson have classified this as a subaltern genocide, meaning a "genocide by the oppressed", and that it contains "morally plausible" elements of retribution or revenge. Jones points out that this type of genocide is less likely to be condemned and may even be welcomed, despite the torture and execution of thousands of women and children on the island.

Armenian genocide

Justification and rationalization are common with regard to the Armenian genocide, as the perpetrators portrayed the killings as legitimate defense against Armenians, who were perceived as traitors and colluding with Russia during a time of war. Both at the time and later, it has been claimed that the deportation of Armenians was justified by military necessity. Historian Hans-Lukas Kieser states: "To justify genocide, Talaat framed a whole discourse and set of arguments, so that the self-righteous justification for murder and destruction remained entrenched in later memoirs, politics, and historiography." Interviewed by Berliner Tageblatt in May 1915, Talaat stated: "We have been blamed for not making a distinction between guilty and innocent Armenians. [To do so] was impossible. Because of the nature of things, one who was still innocent today could be guilty tomorrow. The concern for the safety of Turkey simply had to silence all other concerns. Our actions were determined by national and historical necessity." During the trial of Soghomon Tehlirian, several German newspapers such as the Deutsche Allgemeine Zeitung, the Frankfurter Zeitung or the Berliner Lokal-Anzeiger  published articles and essays which justified the annihilation of the Armenian people.

In 1919, Mustafa Kemal stated:

Historian Erik Jan Zürcher comments, "All the classic elements in the defense of violent aggression are here: they asked for it, it was not really so bad and anyway, others have done the same and worse."

In 1920, parliamentarian Hasan Fehmi stated:

According to Fatma Müge Göçek, "The sentiments of the Turkish state and populace toward these CUP leaders are best captured in one memoir that noted:"

In the interwar era, many Germans believed that the Armenian genocide was justified. Author Stefan Ihrig argues that, in the early 1920s, the Germans who had denied the Armenian genocide switched to justifying it after accepting the historicity of the events.

The Holocaust

The Nazis preferred to justify the killing of Jews rather than deny it entirely. Hitler's prophecy was used to justify the Holocaust. Another example of Nazi justification is the 1943 Posen speeches, in which SS chief Heinrich Himmler argued that the systematic mass murder of Jews was necessary and justified, although an unpleasant task for individual SS men.

During the Einsatzgruppen trial, Otto Ohlendorf, responsible for the deaths of 90,000 Jews, did not deny that the crimes occurred or that he was responsible for them. Instead, he justified the systematic murder as anticipatory self-defense against the mortal threat supposedly posed by Jews, Romani people, Communists, and others. Ohlendorf argued that the killing of Jewish children was necessary because, knowing how their parents died, they would grow up to hate Germany. Ohlendorf's claims were not accepted by the court and he was sentenced to death for crimes against humanity.

Since the end of World War II, cases of justifying the Holocaust have also been observed in Iran, the Arab world, and Eastern Europe, in which the alleged behavior of Jews is claimed to cause antisemitism and justify the killing of Jews. Some Moldovan historians have claimed that the Holocaust in Romania was justified by the lack of loyalty shown by Jews to the interwar Romanian state.

Rwandan genocide
The Rwandan genocide was justified by its perpetrators as a legitimate response to the military campaign of the Rwandan Patriotic Front, including by its mastermind, Théoneste Bagosora, who repeated these arguments at the trial which resulted in his conviction for genocide.

Bosnian genocide

The Srebrenica massacre is justified by Serbian nationalists who argue that it was necessary to defend against the "Muslim threat", or as a justified revenge for the 1993 Kravica attack. However, Serbian nationalists do not acknowledge that genocide occurred in Bosnia despite the ICTY verdict, and argue that the Bosnian death toll is substantially lower than historians and the ICTY have concluded. Conducting interviews with Serbs in Bosnia, Janine Natalya Clark found that many interviewees endorsed the idea "that those killed in Srebrenica were combatants and therefore legitimate military targets", alongside beliefs that the massacre was exaggerated.

Rohingya genocide
Myanmar leader Aung San Suu Kyi defends the military's actions during what has been described as the Rohingya genocide, but she denies that genocide has taken place in Myanmar. Already in 2017, The Intercept reported that she was "an apologist for genocide, ethnic cleansing and mass rape". After her December 2019 remarks in the International Court of Justice, American political scientist William Felice wrote that she used "the same arguments that organizers of genocide and ethnic cleansing deployed throughout the 20th century to validate mass murder". Physicians for Human Rights states that Myanmar "continues to justify their mass extermination [of Rohingya] as a reasonable response to 'terrorist activities.'" Refugees International said that she was "defending the most indefensible of crimes"—genocide.

See also
 Outline of Genocide studies

References

Sources:

Further reading
 Bibliography of Genocide studies

Speech crimes
Genocide
Hate speech